Malawisaurus (meaning "Malawi lizard") is an extinct genus of titanosaurian sauropod dinosaur. It is known from the Dinosaur Beds of northern Malawi, which probably date to the Aptian stage of the Early Cretaceous. The type species is M. dixeyi and the specific name honours Frederick Augustus Dixey.

Discovery and naming

Malawisaurus dixeyi was originally described in 1928 by Sidney H. Haughton as a species of Gigantosaurus (an invalid name for the diplodocid currently known as Tornieria). Haughton considered it closely related to the species G. robustus (later the type species of Janenschia). The holotype was discovered  in the "Dinosaur Beds" of Malawi (then known as the Nyasaland Protectorate), which are usually considered to be of Barremian-Aptian age based on K–Ar dating, though they have also been suggested to be Late Cretaceous in age based on the vertebrate assemblage, and possibly also the Lupata Group. In 1993 it was placed in the newly named genus Malawisaurus by Louis L. Jacobs and colleagues, based on newly collected material from the locality. The holotype is  SAM 7405, a partial skeleton and its type locality is Mwakasyunguti.

Malawisaurus is not known outside of Africa - however, an isolated tooth resembles those associated with Malawisaurus and was found in the Late Cretaceous (Cenomanian)-aged Alcântara Formation of Brazil according to a report in 2007. It is currently listed as "Titanosauria indet., possibly Malawisaurus .sp".

Description
 
In 2020 it was given a smaller estimation of 11 meters (36 ft) and 2.8 tonnes (3.1 short tons). Like some other titanosaurs, ossicles have been found which are believed to represent dermal scutes that covered the skin.

The vertebrae from the middle part of its tail had elongated centra. Malawisaurus had vertebral lateral fossae that resembled shallow depressions. Fossae that similarly resemble shallow depressions are known from Saltasaurus, Alamosaurus, Aeolosaurus, and Gondwanatitan.

Classification
By definition, Malawisaurus has to be the most basal lithostrotian. The cladogram below follows Franca et al. (2016).

See also

 Dinosaur Beds

References

Footnotes

 S. H. Haughton. 1928. On some reptilian remains from the Dinosaur Beds of Nyasaland. Transactions of the Royal Society of South Africa 16:67-75
 Paul, Gregory S. (2010) The Princeton Field Guide to Dinosaurs.
 Tidwell, V., Carpenter, K. & Meyer, S. 2001. New Titanosauriform (Sauropoda) from the Poison Strip Member of the Cedar Mountain Formation (Lower Cretaceous), Utah. In: Mesozoic Vertebrate Life. D. H. Tanke & K. Carpenter (eds.). Indiana University Press, Eds. D.H. Tanke & K. Carpenter. Indiana University Press. 139-165.

External links

 page on Malawisaurus from DinoDictionary.
 New material of an Early Cretaceous titanosaurid dinosaur of Malawi
 Palaeontologica-Electronica - Sauropod Dinosaurs from the Early Cretaceous of Malawi, Africa
 Research Casting International - Malawisaurus dixeyi

Lithostrotians
Aptian life
Early Cretaceous dinosaurs of Africa
Cretaceous Malawi
Fossils of Malawi
Fossil taxa described in 1993
Taxa named by Louis L. Jacobs